Glue is a British television drama shown on E4. It was created and written by Jack Thorne. It began broadcasting from 15 September to 3 November 2014 and comprises eight episodes. The plot revolves around the friends of a 14-year-old boy, Cal Bray, who is found dead. The investigation to find the killer reveals their dark and dirty secrets, hidden behind the picture-perfect English countryside.

Production
The cast was announced on 2 April 2014 and filming took place in Berkshire.

Cast
Main characters
 Yasmin Paige as Ruth Rosen
 Jordan Stephens as Rob Kendle
 Billy Howle as James Warwick
 Charlotte Spencer as Tina Fallon
 Jessie Cave as Annie Maddocks
 Callum Turner as Eli Bray
 Faye Marsay as Janine Riley/Elizabeth Marshall
 Tommy Lawrence Knight as Caleb "Cal" Bray
 Tommy McDonnell as Dominic Richards

Other characters
 Kerry Fox as Jackie Warwick
 Adrian Rawlins as DCI Simson
 Griffin Stevens as Ian Salter
 Christine Tremarco as Nadya Rosen
 Kierston Wareing as Joyce Fallon
 Tony Hirst as Simon Kendle
 Victoria Wicks as Susanna Marshall
 Phoebe Waller-Bridge as Bee Warwick
 Hana Luheshi as Marah
 Ben Pettengell as Benji
 Dean-Charles Chapman as Chris
 Sofia de Azevedo,Sienna de Azevedo as baby Cassie

Cameo
 Max J Green - Extra

Episodes

Series overview

Series 1 (2014)

Reception

Digital Spy described Glue as being "unmissable TV" and also said "this is a whodunnit that will blow your mind". The Independent positively stated that Glue exposes the 'rotting despair of the countryside.'

It premiered in Australia on 7 July 2015 on SBS2.

References

External links
Glue on Channel 4

2014 British television series debuts
2014 British television series endings
2010s British crime drama television series
2010s British mystery television series
British teen drama television series
2010s British television miniseries
Channel 4 television dramas
E4 (TV channel) original programming
English-language television shows
Television series about teenagers
Television series by Sony Pictures Television
Television shows set in England